Adonis pyrenaica, common name Pyrenean pheasant's eye, is a species of plant in the family Ranunculaceae.

Distribution
This very rare species is a native plant of the Pyrenees and Cordillera cantabrica in southwestern Europe. One station is present in the Maritime Alps of southeast France. It is also cultivated as an ornamental plant.

Habitat

Description
Leaves of this plant are alternate, the lower ones have a long petiole. The yellow sepals may be glabrous or slightly hairy. Stamens have yellow anthers. The fruits are in the form of achenes of 6–7 mm, from glabrous to densely pubescent.

Biology
This perennial herbaceous plant is hermaphrodite. It blooms from June to July and it is pollinated by insects (entomophily), where as seeds are disseminated by the animals.

Gallery

Bibliography
Marcel Saule, « Adonis des Pyrénées » dans Le Dictionnaire des Pyrénées, Toulouse, Privat, 1999, 923 p.

References 

pyrenaica
Flora of the Pyrenees